USS Cauto (ID-1538) was a United States Navy cargo ship in commission from 1918 to 1919.

SS Cauto was a commercial cargo ship launched in 1916 and completed on 9 December 1916 at Seattle, Washington, by the Seattle Construction and Drydock Company for the New York and Cuba Mail Steamship Company of New York City. During World War I she came under the control of the United States Shipping Board, and the United States Army chartered her on 15 October 1917 to haul Army cargo during World War I. The U.S. Navy acquired Cauto from the Shipping Board for World War I service on 12 July 1918, assigned her the naval registry Identification Number (Id. No.) 1538, and commissioned as USS Cauto on 13 July 1918.

Assigned to the Naval Overseas Transportation Service, Cauto was outfitted for naval service at Philadelphia, Pennsylvania. Between 21 July 1918 and 9 February 1919, Cauto made three round-trip transatlantic voyages between the United States and France, carrying supplies for the American Expeditionary Force in France.

Cauto was decommissioned at Philadelphia on 22 February 1919 and transferred to the U.S. Shipping Board for return to the New York and Cuba Mail Steamship Company. Once again SS Cauto, she resumed civilian service, operating commercially until wrecked in 1937.

References

Department of the Navy: Naval Historical Center Online Library of Selected Images: Civilian Ships: S.S. Cauto (American Freighter, 1916).Served as USS Cauto (ID # 1538) in 1918-1919
NavSource Online: Section Patrol Craft Photo Archive: Cauto (ID 1538)

World War I cargo ships of the United States
Ships built in Seattle
1916 ships
Cargo ships of the United States Navy